Kipsigicerus is an extinct genus of East African antelope from the Middle Miocene. Its closest living relative is the four-horned-antelope.

It was discovered in Fort Ternan, Kenya and was originally described as a species of Protragocerus. The horn cores were distinct, being highly compressed with eaxh horn growing forward to one another. Because of the unique horn morphology, the genus Kipsigicerus was erected for this species.

Sources
 Classification of Mammals by Malcolm C. McKenna and Susan K. Bell

References

Prehistoric bovids
Miocene even-toed ungulates
Prehistoric even-toed ungulate genera
Miocene mammals of Africa